Bujang Lapok (The three Over-aged Bachelors) is a 1957 Singaporean comedy film directed and performed by P. Ramlee. This is the first of the Bujang Lapok series of films.

Plot

This film depicts the lives of three bachelors and best friends Ramli, Aziz and Sudin. The three of them share a rented room in a house owned by a wealthy widow, Cik Normah. The movie chronicles their challenges in love and how they overcome it. Ramli and Cik Normah are attracted to each other but are always held back by inopportune timing. Sudin is in love with Zaiton, the daughter of a wealthy family next door and who must endure her overbearing mother's prejudices. Also in the movie is Sapiah, whom Cik Normah occasionally helps due to her troubles with her alcoholic gambler of a father. After one more incident which forces Sapiah to run away from home, she tries to drown herself in the river but is rescued by Aziz who then begins to spend a lot more time with her and they subsequently fall in love.

This movie was filmed in various parts of Singapore notably Punggol, Tanjong Changi, Geylang Serai, Kampong Melayu Malay Settlement (Eunos Crescent), Ulu Bedok, Balestier Road's (Jalan Ampas), Bukit Timah and depicts vividly how life was like back in the 50s and the challenges faced by people living in the 'kampungs' (villages).

Cast
 P. Ramlee as Ramli
 Aziz Sattar as Aziz 
 S. Shamsuddin as Sudin
 Normadiah as Normah
 Zaiton as Zaiton
 Dayang Sofia as Sapiah
 Siti Tanjung Perak as Mak Zaiton
 Rahayu Sudarmaji as Ayu
 M. Babjan as Bapak Sapiah
 Sa'amah as Mak Sudin
 Shariff Dol as Sharif
 Malek Sutan Muda as Tuan Manager
 Prani Pramat 
 Rokiah 
 Kemat Hassan 
 M. Rafiee 
 Norsiah Yem
 Habibah Haron
 Nyong Ismail
 Minah Yem
 Mahmud Hitam

Crews
Director: P. Ramlee
Assistants: S. Sudarmadji (Director), Yaakob Mahmud (Camera), Chua Soh Tong & P.V Jhon (Sound), K.K Raman (Editors), Kassim Masdor (Music)
Story: B. H. Chua
Continuity: Kassim Masdor
Lyrics: S. Sudarmadji
Orchestra: B. Yusoff
Playback Singers: Asiah, Nen Junaidah, Normadiah, Jasni, P.Ramlee
Sound Designer: Kamal Mustafa
Art Director: Mustafa Yassin

Songs
Tunggu Sekejap (Opening Theme-Instrumental)
Nak Dara Rindu
Resam Dunia (Dunia ini Hanya Palsu)

Legacy 
The film series had inspired the 2007 animation film, Budak Lapok.

External links

Bujang Lapok / 1957 - Filem Malaysia
Bujang Lapok / The Mouldy Bachelors (1957) at the Singapore Film Locations Archive
Bujang Lapok at sinemamalaysia.com.my

 
Films directed by P. Ramlee
1957 films
Malaysian black-and-white films
Singaporean black-and-white films
Films about social class
Films with screenplays by P. Ramlee
Films scored by P. Ramlee
Malay Film Productions films
Films shot in Singapore
Films set in Singapore
Films set in the 1950s
Malaysian satirical films